The Saw Mill River Parkway (also known as the Saw Mill Parkway or the Saw Mill) is a north–south parkway that extends for  through Westchester County, New York, in the United States. It begins at the border between Westchester County and the Bronx, as the continuation of the Henry Hudson Parkway leaving New York City, and heads generally northeastward to an interchange with Interstate 684 (I-684). At its north end, the parkway serves as a collector/distributor road as it passes east of the hamlet of Katonah. The parkway is named for the Saw Mill River, which the highway parallels for most of its length.

The Saw Mill serves as an important connection from the Taconic State and Sprain Brook parkways to the Tappan Zee Bridge and New York State Thruway. It is a limited-access highway, but not a controlled-access highway as several of its exits are signalized at-grade intersections. The Saw Mill River Parkway is inventoried by the New York State Department of Transportation (NYSDOT) as New York State Route 987D (NY 987D), an unsigned reference route designation.

Route description

Yonkers to Elmsford
The Saw Mill River Parkway begins at the Bronx–Westchester line in Van Cortlandt Park as a continuation of the Henry Hudson Parkway. The Saw Mill River winds northward and parallels a former railroad grade into Yonkers. Now in the Southeast Yonkers section, southbound there is a ramp to McLean Avenue. Passing Tibbetts Lake, the Saw Mill River winds northward alongside the railroad grade as a four-lane roadway as it enters Exit 4, which serves as the western terminus of the Cross County Parkway. Immediately after the Cross County, Exit 5 forks off on a 180-degree turn for Yonkers Avenue and nearby Dunwoodie Golf Course. The parkway becomes at-grade after Exit 5, entering Exit 5A, which services Palmer Road in Northwest Yonkers.

Winding northward through Yonkers, the Saw Mill River Parkway enters Exit 7, a ramp to NY 9A and Tuckahoe Road via Rossiter Avenue. After Exit 7, the parkway begins paralleling the namesake river and NY 9A, now known as Saw Mill River Road, near the Runyon Heights neighborhood. The railroad grade returns near Odell Avenue overpass on the northbound side. Upon entering Exit 9, the parkway enters a series of signaled at-grade interchanges. The first is Exit 9, which serves Executive Boulevard in Yonkers. This is followed by Hearst Street at Exit 10 and Tompkins Avenue at Exit 11. Just north of Exit 11, the Saw Mill River Parkway crosses the city line and enters the town of Hastings-on-Hudson. In Hastings-on-Hudson, the Saw Mill River enters Exit 12, an at-grade interchange with the terminus of the Farragut Parkway.

The next exit, designated Exit 13, is a non-traffic light intersection with Farragut Avenue on both sides of the highway. The four-lane parkway winds north through Hastings-on-Hudson, passing through several suburban sections of town. Keeping in close contact with NY 9A, the Saw Mill River and the railroad grade, Exit 14 splits off southbound at Clarence Avenue. Exit 15 also forks off southbound at an intersection with Cliff Street before the Saw Mill River Parkway crosses into Dobbs Ferry. Upon entering Dobbs Ferry, the parkway enters an intersection with Lawrence Street (Exit 16) and creeps closer to the New York State Thruway (I-87). In Dobbs Ferry, the parkway enters Exit 17, the first full interchange since Tuckahoe Road, connecting to Ashford Avenue and NY 9A.

Continuing northbound through Dobbs Ferry, the southbound parkway enters an intersection with Cyrus Field Road before crossing into Irvington. Through Irvington, the Saw Mill River Parkway parallels the Thruway and the river before turning northeast and crossing into Greenburgh and Exit 20. Exit 20 serves the New York State Thruway northbound via a flyover ramp. After Exit 20, the Saw Mill River Parkway proceeds northeast on a parallel of NY 9A. Continuing alongside the namesake river, the parkway leaves Greenburgh for Elmsford, entering Exit 21E and Exit 21W, which services NY 119 (Main Street) via separate ramps. After a dart to the northwest, the Saw Mill River Parkway crosses under the Cross Westchester Expressway (I-287). While there is no ramp northbound, Exit 22 forks southbound to the westbound Cross Westchester.

Elmsford to Katonah
Crossing back into Greenburgh, the Saw Mill River Parkway continues northwest away from the Saw Mill River. After turning northbound, the parkway enters the Eastview section of Greenburgh, reaching Exit 23, which serves Saw Mill Road and Neperan Road. Exit 23 is the only interchange in Greenburgh as the parkway proceeds into the town of Mount Pleasant. In Mount Pleasant, the parkway enters Exit 25 northbound, a small ramp to NY 9A (Saw Mill River Road). Crossing over the Saw Mill River once again, the parkway winds northeast into Exit 26 near an overpass of NY 9A and NY 100 (Saw Mill River Road). Exit 26, just to the east of NY 9A/NY 100, services the Taconic State Parkway, Bronx River Parkway and Sprain Brook Parkway in the center of Graham Hills County Park via several flyover ramps. Just to the southeast of the interchange is the Hawthorne Metro-North Railroad station.

The Saw Mill River Parkway crosses northeast through Graham Hills County Park, paralleling the Harlem Line and NY 141 through Mount Pleasant. The parkway passes west of the former Thornwood station before turning northwest and away from NY 141. Just after the turn, Exit 27 comes at-grade, a junction with Marble Avenue, which connects to NY 141. The parkway runs along a short westbound stretch, crossing into the village of Pleasantville. Going northward in Pleasantville, Exit 28 forks off northbound only to Bedford Road, which connects to downtown Pleasantville. Proceeding southbound, Exit 29 accesses NY 117 (Pleasantville Road). The parkway turns northeast and enters Exit 30 for Grant Street near the Pleasantville Metro-North station.

The Saw Mill River Parkway and the Harlem Line parallel once again in the northern reaches of Pleasantville, paralleling the Saw Mill River into the town of New Castle. Now in the hamlet of Chappaqua, Exit 32 southbound accesses NY 120 at Mill River Road. Nearby this junction is the Chappaqua Metro-North station. After crossing under NY 120, the northbound Exit 32 connects to Hunts Place, which connects to NY 120. Running along a hillside in New Castle, the parkway becomes a divided highway for a short distance, becoming a two-lane roadway northbound. No interchange is present along this stretch and the lanes come back together just south of Exit 33, an at-grade intersection with Reader's Digest Road. At this interchange, the parkway has access to the former global headquarters of Reader's Digest and nearby NY 117.

The parkway continues northeast through the town of New Castle, passing northwest of the Mount Kisco Country Club before entering the village of Mount Kisco. Just southwest of the Mount Kisco Metro-North station, the parkway and railroad fork in different directions, with the parkway turning north into Exit 34, an at-grade interchange with NY 133 (West Main Street). In the northern reaches of Mount Kisco, Exit 36 services Croton Avenue from the southbound lanes. Just to the north, the Saw Mill River Parkway enters Exit 37, a junction with Kisco Avenue and nearby Pines Bridge Road (unsigned County Route 1323). Now in the town of Bedford, the parkway enters Exit 38, two separate at-grade intersections for Green Lane. Green Lane is also the last at-grade intersection on the Saw Mill River Parkway northbound.

Crossing south of Bedford Hills Memorial Park, the Saw Mill River Parkway enters the hamlet of Bedford Hills. In Bedford Hills, the parkway enters Exit 39, which connects to the hamlet and NY 117 (Bedford Road). Also present at this interchange is the Bedford Hills Metro-North station. The parkway divides once again through Bedford Hills, paralleling NY 117 through the community. The parkway then enters Exit 42, an interchange for NY 117 and Railroad Avenue. At Harris Road, NY 117 crosses over the parkway, paralleling the northbound lanes of the Saw Mill River Parkway on a nearby bypass. NY 117 soon merges into the Saw Mill River Parkway (Exit 43 southbound) before the Saw Mill River Parkway enters the right-of-way for Interstate 684, where the parkway terminates just east of Katonah.

History

The Saw Mill Parkway started construction in 1926. By 1930, it had reached Route 119 in Elmsford. Construction had only reached Chappaqua by 1940 when World War II halted any further progress. The Saw Mill Parkway was constructed along the Saw Mill River along with a sewer which was to both drain sewage from Yonkers and act as flood control for points north. The full length of the parkway was opened in 1955.

The Parkway once fed into the accident-prone Hawthorne Circle, a former roundabout at the intersection of the Taconic Parkway extension from the Bronx River Parkway, Taconic State, and Saw Mill River parkways. In 1972 the circle was rebuilt as a three-level interchange.

NYSDOT has maintained the Saw Mill River Parkway since 1980, after abolition of the East Hudson Parkway Authority. Under NYSDOT, the 25¢ toll between exits 3 and 4, which was originally implemented by Westchester County in 1936, was removed on October 31, 1994, with the last tour just before midnight. The tolls were abolished on the Saw Mill River and Hutchinson River parkways in November 1994.

From October 1990 into the Summer of 1992, NYSDOT built the Katonah Bypass and converted the segment between there and Interstate 684 into an overlap with part of a realigned NY 117.

Exit list

See also

References

External links

 Saw Mill River Parkway Service Stations (Hudson River Valley Ruins)

Parkways in New York (state)
Robert Moses projects
Transportation in Westchester County, New York
Former toll roads in New York (state)